Shigemoto (written: 重本) is a Japanese surname. Notable people with the surname include:

, Japanese television personality, model, singer and voice actress

Shigemoto (written: 成元) is also a masculine Japanese given name. Notable people with the name include:

, Japanese ski jumper

Japanese-language surnames
Japanese masculine given names